The  2017 Lucknow Municipal Corporation election was an election of members to the Lucknow Municipal Corporation which governs Lucknow, capital and the largest city of Indian state of Uttar Pradesh. It took place on 26 November 2017.

Total number of voters were 24,43,991 out of which 13,01,788 were male voters and 11,42,203 were female voters.

Schedule 
The elections of 2017 Lucknow Municipal Corporation were announced by the Uttar Pradesh State Election Commission.

The elections of LMC were held in single phase on 26 November 2017 and the results were announced on 1 December 2017.

Results 
Results of LMC were announced on 1 December 2017 the Bharatiya Janata Party (BJP) lead NDA alliance won with absolute majority by winning 58 seats out of 110.

On 12 December 2017, the mayoral candidate of BJP, Sanyukta Bhatia sworn as the 14th and first female mayor of the LMC in last 100 years.

Corporator Elections of 2017

Source:

See also
Lucknow Municipal Corporation
2017 elections in India
2017 Uttar Pradesh Legislative Assembly election

References

Lucknow
Lucknow
Lucknow
Government of Lucknow